Chief Joseph Pass (elev. ) is a mountain pass on the continental divide of the Rocky Mountains in the northwestern United States joining Lemhi County, Idaho, and Beaverhead County, Montana.  The pass is in the Bitterroot Mountains and is traversed by Montana Highway 43; it is named after Chief Joseph of the Wallowa band of the Nez Perce tribe, who traversed the pass in the summer of 1877 during the Nez Perce War, prior to the Battle of the Big Hole to the east.

West of the pass, the highway connects with US-93 at Lost Trail Pass, about a half-mile (0.8 km) west of the divide.

This is the northernmost pass on the continental divide between Idaho and Montana. Less than a mile north, the divide heads eastward into Montana, following the Ravalli–Beaverhead county line towards Butte, then north to Glacier National Park.

In early September 1805, the westbound Lewis and Clark Expedition crossed either this pass or the nearby Lost Trail Pass (from the Idaho side) as they descended northward into the Bitterroot Valley of what is now Ravalli County, and later crossed Lolo Pass back into Idaho.

See also
 Mountain passes in Montana

Notes

Mountain passes of Idaho
Mountain passes of Montana
Landforms of Lemhi County, Idaho
Landforms of Beaverhead County, Montana
Transportation in Lemhi County, Idaho
Transportation in Beaverhead County, Montana